Gitit may refer to:
 Gitit (software), a wiki software
 Gitit, Bik'at HaYarden, Israeli settlement on the West Bank
 Gittith, a Biblical musical designation